Donald Joyce Hall Jr., is the executive chairman of Hallmark Cards.

Early life
Donald J. Hall Jr. is the son of Adele (née Coryell) and Donald J. Hall Sr. He is the grandson of Joyce Hall. Both his father and grandfather were chief executives of Hallmark Cards.

Career
Hall joined Hallmark Cards in 1971 and worked in manufacturing, customer service, product development and sales. In 1990, Hall became a member of the board of directors. In 1993, Hall became general manager of Hallmark Keepsake Ornaments, the Christmas ornament brand. In 1995, he became vice president of creative. In 1997, Hall became vice president of product development and in 1999 he became executive vice president of strategy and development. In January 2002, following the retirement of Irvine O. Hockaday Jr., Hall became president and CEO. In 2015, his brother David E. Hall became president. In 2019, Hall assumed the role of executive chairman of the board of directors.

Hall also serves on the board of directors of Crown Media Holdings and Hallmark International.

Personal life
Hall is married.

References 

Year of birth missing (living people)
Living people
American chief executives of manufacturing companies
American mass media owners
Businesspeople from Kansas
People from the Kansas City metropolitan area
Hallmark Cards people
Missouri Republicans